Vepris borenensis is a species of plant in the family Rutaceae. It is found in Ethiopia and Kenya.

References

borenensis
Flora of Ethiopia
Flora of Kenya
Taxonomy articles created by Polbot